Leopoldo Torlonia (25 July 1853—23 October 1918) was an Italian nobleman and politician, who was   Mayor of Rome from May 1882 to May 1887.

He was the third duke of Poli and of Guadagnolo.

He was dismissed from office in 1887 by then Prime Minister Francesco Crispi for congratulating Pope Leo XIII on his Jubilee.

References

1853 births
1918 deaths
L
Politicians from Rome
Mayors of Rome